2NE1 (also known as 2NE1 1st Mini Album) is the eponymous debut extended play by South Korean girl group 2NE1. The album was released by YG Entertainment on July 8, 2009, and contains seven songs composed and produced by Korean producers Teddy Park and Kush. The EP was commercially successful in South Korea, where it was the best-selling album by a female artist and the third best-selling album overall in 2009.

Background
2NE1's first song was "Lollipop", digitally released on March 27, 2009. The song was created for LG Cyon to promote their Lollipop phone, and it was a joint release with Big Bang; the commercial/music video debuted on March 28, 2009. Although it was not a promoted single (as it was an advertisement song, there were problems with network chart eligibility), "Lollipop" proved to be a strong chart hit, going to #1 on various online charts and topping music television network Mnet's online chart for four weeks in a row. It was also profiled in Perez Hilton's blog. However, questions were raised about the group's future, as the song's success was attributed to the popularity of BigBang.

On April 30, Yang Hyun-suk revealed that 2NE1's debut song would be a hip hop/reggae song, and that it would be digitally released on May 6, 2009. Titled "Fire", the song was fully written and produced by 1TYM's Teddy Park. Teasers of the song were released on their official website at the beginning of May, with a 20-second clip released on May 1.

Commercial performance
The extended play was a commercial success in South Korea. It recorded over 50,000 pre-orders within a week—a high amount for a rookie group at the time, and sold over 80,000 copies within two weeks after its release. In early August, the EP surpassed sales of 100,000 copies. On the Hanteo album chart, 2NE1 1st Mini Album was the best-selling girl group album and the third best-selling album overall during 2009.

Five of the EP's tracks ranked within the top 100 on the year-end Melon chart for 2009—the most by any act during the year—and led to the EP being named among the most successful digital albums in K-pop history according to Star News. It continued to show strong sales by charting on the 2010 year end chart for Gaon, selling an additional 40,949 copies. It has since sold over 225,000 copies as of September 2016.

Singles
"Lollipop", written and produced by Teddy Park, was digitally released on March 27, 2009. Despite not being promoted traditionally by both groups, the song nonetheless was a major success in South Korea; giving the girls a number #1 song before their debut.

"Fire" became a hit on various on- and offline charts. It was released as planned on May 6, with two versions of the music video—a "space" version and a "street" version—released the same day. The videos received over one million views in a day; the view count then increased to two million.

"I Don't Care" was the third single from 2NE1, co-produced by Teddy and YG's newly signed rising producer Kush. Soon after its release, the music video was also profiled in Perez Hilton's blog who declared them his "favorite" Korean girl-group. The single went on to win Song of the Year at the 2009 Mnet Asian Music Awards, making them the first group to win the accolade in the same year of debut, and the second rookie to win after Big Bang for "Lies" (2007).

Promotion
The group's first performance of the song was on May 17, 2009, on SBS's Inkigayo. beginning the group's activities. Their first performance was also included in Perez Hilton's blog once again, showing his interest towards the group.

Both the song and the group have been very popular online, with the song topping M.Net's online chart and the group's name becoming a top search term. The group was also rewarded with three Cyworld Digital Music Awards, with both "Lollipop" and "Fire" winning "Song of the Month" awards and the group winning "Rookie of the Month" for May 2009. They received their first Mutizen award during their fourth stage performance in SBS Inkigayo (Popular Song) on June 14, 2009. They received their second Mutizen award on SBS Inkigayo (Popular Song) on June 21, 2009.
For closed the promotion of the first mini album was released the song "In The Club" as first promotional single of the album.

Accolades

Track listing

Production
 Mastering: Tom Coyne (Sterling Sound)

Charts

Weekly charts

Monthly charts

Year-end charts

Release history

References

External links
 2NE1 official site

2009 debut EPs
YG Entertainment EPs
2NE1 albums
Korean-language EPs
Albums produced by Teddy Park